James Young is an Irish hurler from County Laois.

He plays for the Clonaslee–St Manman's club and was a regular on the senior Laois county team, for whom he was regularly one of the highest scoring players in the country.

In 2006, James received a nomination for an All-Star award.

In 2007, he was nominated for the Vodafone GAA Hurling All Stars awards.

In 2009, he announced his retirement from the sport.

Championship appearances

References

Year of birth missing (living people)
Living people
Clonaslee–St Manmans hurlers
Laois inter-county hurlers